Admiral Symonds may refer to:

James Symonds (born 1954), U.S. Navy rear admiral
Thomas Symonds (Royal Navy officer, died 1894) (1811–1894), British Royal Navy admiral
William Symonds (1782–1856), British Royal Navy rear admiral

See also
Richard Symonds-Tayler (1897–1971), British Royal Navy admiral